Norayr Artashesi Sahakyan (born 7 October 1987 in the Soviet Union) is an Armenian football midfielder who plays for club Armenian Premier League club Alashkert FC. He is also a member of the Armenia national team, participated in 3 international matches since his debut in away friendly match against Malta on 2 February 2008.

Achievements
Armenian Premier League with Pyunik FC: 2005, 2006, 2007, 2008, 2009
Armenian Premier League with Ulisses F.C.: 2011
Armenian Supercup with Pyunik FC: 2006

External links
 Profile at ffa.am
 

1987 births
Living people
Armenian footballers
Armenian Premier League players
Armenia international footballers
FC Pyunik players
Ulisses FC players
FC Alashkert players
Association football midfielders